Harry Rigby may refer to:

 Harry Rigby (producer) (1925–1985), American theatre producer and writer
 Harry Rigby (aviator) (1896–1972), Australian World War I flying ace
 Harry Rigby (footballer) (1878–1924), Australian rules footballer